The Cathedral of the Resurrection and St. Thomas the Apostle, commonly known as Zamość Cathedral, is a religious building that is affiliated with the Catholic Church and is located in the old town of Zamość, a city in southeastern Poland.

It is a church built in the late 16th century. It is located in the so-called Route of Renaissance. The Cathedral was established by the city's founder, Jan Zamoyski, and the author of the project was architect Bernardo Morando an Italian, who took as a reference to the Italian churches of centuries XV and XVI. Initially it was a collegiate church until 1992, when the Diocese of Zamosc-Lubaczów, who rose to the rank of cathedral by decision of then Pope John Paul II was established.

See also
Roman Catholicism in Poland
St. Thomas's Cathedral

References

Roman Catholic cathedrals in Poland
Buildings and structures in Zamość